Gary Jobson is a sailor, television commentator and author based in Annapolis, Maryland.  He is a Vice President of the International Sailing Federation. Gary has authored 19 sailing books and is Editor at Large of Sailing World and Cruising World magazines. He is President of the National Sailing Hall of Fame.

Lifetime
Raised in Toms River, New Jersey, Jobson graduated from Toms River High School (now Toms River High School South) in 1969 and was inducted into the school district's hall of fame in 1990.

In college, at SUNY Maritime, he won the Men's Singlehanded National Championship in 1972 and 1973 and the Sloop National Championship in 1973; was an All-American sailor three times; and was twice named College Sailor of the Year.

Jobson covered the 34th America's Cup for NBC. He won an A.C.E. (Award for Cable Excellence) for the 1987 America's Cup on ESPN.  In 1988 Jobson won an Emmy for his production of sailing at the Olympic Games in South Korea and won an Emmy for the 2005–06 Volvo Ocean Race on PBS.  His newest book is Chasing Roosters  A Century of Sailing on Barnegat Bay.  In 2013 Jobson was presented a Telly Award (Recognizes distinction in creative work in broadcast/non-broadcast video productions) for Unfurling the World  The Voyages of Irving and Electa Johnson.

He has won many championships in one design classes, the America's Cup with Ted Turner, the famous Fastnet Race and many of the world's ocean races.

Gary is also an active cruising sailor. He has led ambitious expeditions to the Arctic, Antarctica and Cape Horn.

He was a tactician for Ted Turner on Courageous during the 1977 America's Cup and also during the 1980 defender trials. In 1983, he was the founder and tactician of the Courageous/Defender syndicate.

Jobson was inducted into the National Sailing Hall of Fame (2011) and the America's Cup Hall of Fame (2003) by the Herreshoff Marine Museum. In 1999 Jobson won the Nathanael G. Herreshoff Trophy, US SAILING's most prestigious award.

Gary has been the National Chairman of The Leukemia Cup Regatta program since 1994. These events have raised over $50 million to date. In 2012 the University of Maryland Medical School established The Gary Jobson Professorship in Medical Oncology. Jobson was awarded a Doctor of Letters from the State University of New York Maritime College in 2005 and a Doctor of Human Letters from Lakeland College in 2013.

Over the past 40 years, Gary has given over 2500 lectures throughout the world. He started his career as a sailing coach at the U.S. Merchant Marine Academy and the U.S. Naval Academy. He is a Past President of US Sailing (2009-2012).

In 2021, Gary served as NBC's official commentator for the 2020 Tokyo Olympics Sailing events.

Gary and his wife, Janice, have three grown daughters, Kristi, Ashleigh and Brooke and two grandsons, Declan and Franklin.

Awards

Jobson won the All-America Intercollegiate Sailing Team from 1971 to 1973. In 1972 and 1973, he was awarded Intercollegiate Sailor of the Year. He was the America's Cup Winning Tactician in 1977 sailing on Courageous. He was elected to the Sailing World Hall of Fame in 1982 and won the Cable Ace Awards for the 1987 America's Cup. He was awarded an Emmy in 1988 for his coverage of the 1988 Olympic Games - Yachting.
Jobson's next award came in 1999, the Nathanael G. Herreshoff Award from US Sailing. This was followed by the Best Sports Book Award of 2002, awarded him in 2003 by the Independent Publisher Book Awards in America for his book Fighting Finish. In the same year, Jobson was inducted into the Herreshoff Museum America's Cup Hall of Fame. In 2004, he received the Spiral of Life Award from the Leukemia & Lymphoma Society and in 2011 Jobson received the Charles M. Leighton Award for Outstanding Service. In 2013, Mr. Jobson was selected for the Hope Funds for Cancer Research Awards of Excellence in the area of Advocacy for both his work in creating the Leukemia Cup and his courage, resilience and advocacy as a lymphoma patient himself.

Board of directors
Jobson either serves on or has served on the boards of Operation Sail, US Sailing, Olympic Sailing Committee, Leukemia Cup Regatta Series, Fales Committee (US Naval Academy), New York Yacht Club, International Yacht Restoration School, San Francisco Yacht Club, Annapolis Yacht Club, and the National Sailing Hall of Fame. Currently serving as Chair of the Chesapeake Bay Trust Board of Directors.

Board of Trustees

Jobson serves on the Board of Trustees of Hope Funds for Cancer Research and St. Mary's College of Maryland.

References

External links
 Jobson Sailing

Year of birth missing (living people)
Living people
American male sailors (sport)
1977 America's Cup sailors
ICSA College Sailor of the Year
Maritime Privateers sailors
Sportspeople from Annapolis, Maryland
State University of New York Maritime College alumni
St. Mary's College of Maryland
Writers from Annapolis, Maryland
1980 America's Cup sailors
1983 America's Cup sailors
People from Toms River, New Jersey
World Sailing officials
Toms River High School South alumni